Egress Peak is a peak rising to   east of Mount Albert Markham in the Churchill Mountains of Antarctica. Situated at the western extremity of the Carlstrom Foothills, the peak overlooks a  ice divide. Benbrook Glacier flows south from the divide into Flynn Glacier; an unnamed glacier flows north from the divide into Jorda Glacier. The peak was so named by the Advisory Committee on Antarctic Names because of the emergence of the two glaciers adjacent to this peak.

References 

Mountains of Oates Land